Tim Slatter is a former professional rugby league footballer who played in the 1980s.

Playing career
Slatter made his début for Featherstone Rovers on Tuesday 1 February 1983, during his time at Featherstone Rovers he scored ten 3-point tries, and three 4-point tries.

Challenge Cup Final appearances
Slatter played right-, i.e. number 12, in Featherstone Rovers' 14-12 victory over Hull F.C. in the 1983 Challenge Cup Final during the 1982–83 season at Wembley Stadium, London on Saturday 7 May 1983, in front of a crowd of 84,969.

References

External links
Statistics at rugbyleagueproject.org
Gary Siddall
April 2013
The Story of Wembley 1983. Part I - a featherstone rovers blog
The Story of Wembley 1983. Part II - a featherstone rovers blog
The Story of Wembley 1983. Part III - a featherstone rovers blog
The Story of Wembley 1983. Part IV - a featherstone rovers blog
The Story of Wembley 1983. Part V - a featherstone rovers blog
The Story of Wembley 1983. Part VI - a featherstone rovers blog
The Story of Wembley 1983. Part VII - a featherstone rovers blog
The Story of Wembley 1983. Part VIII - a featherstone rovers blog
The Story of Wembley 1983. Part IX - a featherstone rovers blog
The Story of Wembley 1983. Part X - a featherstone rovers blog

Living people
Featherstone Rovers players
English rugby league players
Place of birth missing (living people)
Rugby league second-rows
Wakefield Trinity players
Year of birth missing (living people)